Vitali Ermakovich Kabaloev (born ) is a Russian Greco-Roman wrestler of Kabardian descent. He won gold in the 55 kg event at the 2019 European Championships held in Bucharest, Romania. In 2020, he won the silver medal in the 55 kg event at the 2020 European Championships held in Rome, Italy.

He is a twofold national champion, winning in 2018 and 2019.

In 2018, at the 2018 World U23 Wrestling Championship held in Bucharest, Romania, he won the silver medal in the 55 kg event.

Major results

References

External links 
 

Living people
Place of birth missing (living people)
Russian male sport wrestlers
1996 births
Sportspeople from Kabardino-Balkaria
European Wrestling Championships medalists
20th-century Russian people
21st-century Russian people